is a Japanese voice actor.

Career
He attended the Amusement Media Academy and the Japan Narration Actors Institute. He worked as a part time assistant and experienced three years of custody, recruiting registration and six years of laying down. He won the New Actor Award at the 4th Seiyu Awards.

Personal life

In 2020, Maeno announced that he had married voice actress Mikako Komatsu. On 17 August 2022, they announced that Komatsu was pregnant with their first child. On 15 January 2023, they welcomed their first child.

Filmography

Anime series

Anime films

Tokusatsu

Live-action film

Video games

Drama CDs

Dubbing

Live-action

Animation

References

External links
Official agency profile 

 Anime and manga portal

1982 births
Living people
Male voice actors from Ibaraki Prefecture
Japanese male video game actors
Japanese male voice actors
21st-century Japanese male actors
Arts Vision voice actors